James Edward Freeman (July 24, 1866 – June 6, 1943) was the third bishop of the Episcopal Diocese of Washington, serving from 1923 to 1943.

Biography
Freeman was born on July 24, 1866 in New York City. He was educated in public school in New York after which he commenced employment in the accounting department of the Long Island Railroad. He also worked with the Hudson River and New York Central Railroad. After fifteen years he started to train for the priesthood after he was encouraged by the Bishop of New York Horatio Potter. 

He was ordained deacon on May 20, 1894 and priest a year later. After ordination he served in St John's Church and of St Andrew's Chapel, both in Yonkers, New York. In 1909 he became rector of St Mark's Church in Minneapolis, Minnesota, the present day cathedral. In 1921 he moved to Washington, D.C. to become rector of the Church of the Epiphany. 

He was elected Coadjutor Bishop of West Texas in 1911 however he declined the offer. He also lost the election for the Bishop of Colorado by one vote and refused the position of Dean of New York's Cathedral of St. John the Divine. Freeman was also elected as Bishop of Washington in 1923, a position which he accepted. He was consecrated on September 29, 1923 by Thomas F. Gailor, Bishop of Tennessee. During his episcopacy, he led a national campaign to raise funds for the construction of the Washington National Cathedral. He also officiated at memorial services for Warren G. Harding, Woodrow Wilson, and William Howard Taft.

References

External links
 

1866 births
1943 deaths
Episcopal bishops of Washington